Helvadere is a town (belde) and municipality in the Aksaray District, Aksaray Province, Turkey. Its population is 2,564 (2021).

Geography 

History 

Helvadere is situated next to ruins of the ancient town Nora, which was an important town in Hellenistic Capadocia. Eventually, the town lost its former importance and in the Middle Ages it was a small village named  Hardaldere.  Evliya Çelebi in his Seyahatname describes hardaldere  as a village of 65 houses;  the majority of the population being Turk, but also with a Greek minority. In the early 20th century, the name was Halvadara. But in 1968 Halvadara was declared a town named Helvadere.

Economy 

Helvadere is a typical agricultural town. Potato, apple and cherry are among the more important crops. Some members of the town work in western Europe as industrial workers  (gastarbeiter) and they also contribute to the town's economy.

Churches 

 Kemerli Kilise, "Arched church"

 Yardıbaş Kilise

 Süt Kilise, “Milk church"

 Bozboyun Kilise

 Tepe Kilisesi, "Hill church"

References

Populated places in Aksaray District
Towns in Turkey